James Edward Handiboe (1866–1942), was an American professional baseball player who played pitcher in the Major Leagues for the 1886 Pittsburgh Alleghenys. He played minor league baseball until 1901.

External links

1866 births
1942 deaths
Major League Baseball pitchers
Pittsburgh Alleghenys players
19th-century baseball players
Columbus Senators players
Canton Nadjys players
Altoona Mud Turtles players
Columbus Statesmen players
Augusta Kennebecs players
Taunton Herrings players
Stratford Poets players
Woodstock Bains players
Chatham Reds players
Albany Senators players
Memphis Egyptians players
Baseball players from Columbus, Ohio